The Tasmanian Historical Research Association is a Hobart based Tasmanian historical group and publisher in existence since 1951. 

Earlier groups concerned about history and historical preservation occurred in the 1890s and 1920s.  The Tasmania Society in the 1930s (then the Historical Society of Tasmania in the 1940s) was another group that preceded the association.  The Launceston Royal Society became the Launceston Historical Society in 1988.

The association has been a publisher of a long lasting Papers and Proceedings (short name: Tas. Hist. Res. Assoc.) and various books on Tasmanian history.

The THRA is a constituent member of the Federation of Australian Historical Societies.

Publications 
 Papers and Proceedings.
 Alexander, Alison (1987). Governors' ladies: the wives and mistresses of Van Dieman's Land governors. Sandy Bay, Tas.: Tasmanian Historical Research Association. .

References

Further reading 
 
 Campbell Macknight. "Historiography". pp. 174–175.
 Stefan Petrow. "Historical Societies". pp. 173–174.

External links
 

History of Tasmania
Historical societies of Australia
1951 establishments in Australia